Thomas J. Gillen    (May 18, 1862 – January 26, 1889) was a 19th-century Major League Baseball player. He played primarily catcher during the 1884 season for the Philadelphia Keystones of the Union Association and during the 1886 season for the Detroit Wolverines of the National League.

Sources

1862 births
1889 deaths
19th-century baseball players
Baseball players from Philadelphia
Major League Baseball catchers
Philadelphia Keystones players
Detroit Wolverines players
Macon (minor league baseball) players
Savannah (minor league baseball) players